Billingborough and Horbling railway station was a station serving the villages of Billingborough, Horbling and Threekingham, Lincolnshire on the Great Northern Railway Bourne and Sleaford railway. It opened in 1872 and closed to passengers in 1930. The section from Bourne to Billingborough remained open for goods until 1964.

References

External links
 ; Billingborough and Horbling station on 1891 OS map.

Disused railway stations in Lincolnshire
Former Great Northern Railway stations
Railway stations in Great Britain opened in 1872
Railway stations in Great Britain closed in 1930